Harry E. Bergold, Jr. (November 11, 1931 – May 16, 1995) was an American diplomat. He was known for providing the information to journalists that led to the discovery that U.S. government funds were being illegally sent to anti-Sandinista fighters in Nicaragua.

Bergold was born in Olean, New York on November 11, 1931. He served as the U.S. Ambassador to Hungary and Nicaragua “before his career was cut short by conservatives in the Senate.” A year after he returned from Nicaragua, Ronald Reagan nominated him to be ambassador to Morocco.  Senator Jesse Helms and several others felt “Bergold had not been sufficiently tough on the leftist contras during his tenure in Managua, objected to his nomination and defeated it.” He also provides vital information Oliver North and his supporters helped defeat his nomination. All of this is what Bergold went around saying. The truth is that Bergold, as ambassador to Nicaragua, was buying local currency on the black market at a rate far below the official rate, and then filing expense vouchers with the State Department claiming reimbursement at the official rate. He ripped off the taxpayers for thousands of dollars and when caught by the State Inspector General was required to pay back to the American taxpayer all the money he had illegally obtained. Deputy Secretary John Whitehead asked the Senate to stop all further consideration of Bergold's nomination and informed the Senators that Bergold was being forced out of the Service for corruption. Filing fraudulent expense vouchers claiming you purchased local currency at the official rate when you were buying it on the black market is a violation of 18 U.S. Code 1001. Each voucher was a separate count. Bergold should have spent his final years in a federal prison.

Bergold earned a Bachelor of Arts degree from Yale in 1953, served in the Army, and then returned to Yale to earn a Master of Arts degree in 1957. He died at his home in Paris on May 16, 1995, at the age of 63. He had been suffering from cancer.

References

1931 births
1995 deaths
People from Olean, New York
20th-century American diplomats
Ambassadors of the United States to Hungary
Ambassadors of the United States to Nicaragua
Yale University alumni
Deaths from cancer in France